St. Stanislaus Parish (Polish language: Parafia św. Stanisława Kostki w Bristol)was originally built to serve Polish immigrants in Bristol, Connecticut, United States.

It was founded in 1919 and is one of the Polish-American Roman Catholic parishes in New England in the Archdiocese of Hartford.

History 
On April 21, 1919,  Bishop John Joseph Nilan named Fr. George Bartlewski founding pastor of St. Stanislaus Parish.
The construction of a  basement church, Bishop John Joseph Nilan blessed on September 26, 1920. Auxiliary Bishop John G. Murray dedicated the basement church on May 30, 1921.

In 1954 the basement church was demolished and Masses were temporarily moved to the school hall as plans were made to complete the church. A new Gothic edifice in brick rose on the site of the original church and was dedicated on May 20, 1956. The architect of the new church was James J. O'Shaughnessy.

The organ at St. Stanislaus Church was built in 1956 by Austin Organs, Inc. It is a two manual instrument with 13 ranks of pipes.

School 
 St. Stanislaus School

Bibliography 
 
 The Official Catholic Directory in USA

External links 
 St. Stanislaus - Diocesan information
 St. Stanislaus - ParishesOnline.com
 Archdiocese of Hartford
 St. Stanislaus - Discovermass.com

Roman Catholic parishes of Archdiocese of Hartford
Polish-American Roman Catholic parishes in Connecticut
Buildings and structures in Bristol, Connecticut
Churches in Hartford County, Connecticut
1919 establishments in Connecticut
Roman Catholic churches completed in 1920
20th-century Roman Catholic church buildings in the United States